Lance Revill (born 30 August 1953) is the former president of the New Zealand Professional Boxing Association (NZPBA), a New Zealand boxing promoter, referee, and a former New Zealand professional boxer. Revill compiled a professional record of 21 wins and 13 losses, with 13 knockouts, in light heavyweight bouts fought in New Zealand and Australia between 1974 and 1990.

Amateur and professional highlights
Revill represented New Zealand as an amateur boxer at the Commonwealth Games and won the bronze medal in the men's light middleweight division. Revill won the New Zealand light heavyweight boxing title in 1979 and the New Zealand heavyweight boxing title in 1988, and was 2-4 overall in national title bouts. Revill is best remembered for two professional bouts in 1989. The first, in a bout Revill was ruled to have lost in the second round, took place in Auckland, New Zealand, on 27 February 1989, as Revill, fighting at a career high 198 pounds, injured an arm when the ring collapsed. The other, Revill's best performance, took place on 24 May 1989, in New South Wales, Australia. In Revill's only ring appearance outside of New Zealand, Revill lost a 12-round split decision to Apollo Sweet in a bout for the vacant Commonwealth (British Empire), Australasian title and OPBF cruiserweight titles.

Controversy
As president, Revill stated opinions frankly and publicly, bringing attention to the association.

In 2009, Revill was seen having an intense argument with the president of the rival New Zealand National Boxing Federation, Gary McCrystal, after an event that the Federation had commissioned in Revill's ring. Both presidents called each other an embarrassment to the sport.

Some comments focused on New Zealand heavyweight Joseph Parker. Revill's comments made news when Parker turned professional. He also said that Parker's promoters were only being interested in money, that Parker was being too hyped up and that Parker's December 2016 world title fight against Andy Ruiz was unjustified. In February 2017, backlash from these comments saw Revill resign as president of the NZPBA. Vice president John Conway was named interim president.

Personal life
Revill was born in Auckland, where he resides with his wife Denise. They have four children: Lance Jacob (Jake) Revill, Lisa Ann Hohneck, Tanya Colleen Revill and Kylie Denise Bell. Kylie is listed as an official of the NZPBA on its website.

Boxing titles

Amateur
Gold Medal 1972 New Zealand Amateur National Championship (71kg)
Gold Medal 1973 New Zealand Amateur National Championship (71kg)
Bronze Medal 1974 Christchurch Commonwealth Games Men's Boxing (71kg)
 Gold medal 1973 Oceania games in Nouméa 69 kg

Professional
New Zealand Boxing Association light heavyweight title (174½Ibs)
New Zealand Boxing Association heavyweight title (193½Ibs)
South Pacific Cruiserweight Title

Professional boxing record

References

External links
Professional record of Lance Revill at Boxrec

New Zealand professional boxing champions
Boxers at the 1974 British Commonwealth Games
Commonwealth Games bronze medallists for New Zealand
Living people
1953 births
New Zealand male boxers
Commonwealth Games medallists in boxing
Light-middleweight boxers
Medallists at the 1974 British Commonwealth Games